Bryan Wilson may refer to:
 Bryan R. Wilson (1926–2004), British professor of sociology
 Bryan Wilson (sport shooter) (born 1962), Australian sport shooter
 Bryan Andrew Wilson (born 1981), American gospel musician and pastor

See also
 Brian Wilson (born 1942), American musician, singer, songwriter and record producer
 Brian Wilson (disambiguation)